Galaxy: Earth Sphere is a 1989 fountain and sculpture by Joe Davis, installed in Kendall Square, Cambridge, Massachusetts, United States. The artwork was designed to emit streams of low-temperature steam from time to time, but the pipes sourcing this emission have been broken for some time.

References

External links
 Galaxy: Earth Sphere Fountain, Kendall Square – Cambridge, MA at Waymarking

1989 establishments in Massachusetts
1989 sculptures
Fountains in Massachusetts
Maps in art
Outdoor sculptures in Cambridge, Massachusetts